David Wright is a professor of history at McGill University in Montreal, Canada. He is the current Canada Research Chair in the History of Health Policy.

Early life and education
Wright completed both a Bachelor of Arts and a Master of Arts in history at McGill University. He then completed a Doctor of Philosophy (DPhil) in history at the University of Oxford. He finally completed a post-doctoral research fellowship specializing in the history of health and medicine at the University of Oxford.

Research

Academic staff of McGill University
Canada Research Chairs
Alumni of the University of Oxford
McGill University alumni
Living people
Year of birth missing (living people)